Victoria foundry, (or works) may refer to:

UK
Victoria Foundry, Chesterfield. Predecessor to Markham & Co.
Victoria Foundry, Walmgate, York. 1850s establishment of the Walker Iron Foundry
Victoria Foundry/works, Bolton. See List of mills in Bolton
Victoria Foundry, Hyde Bank Road, New Mills, Derbyshire
Victoria Foundry, Garside Street, Bolton. Foundry of Knight and Wood, predecessor of J & E Wood
Victoria Works, Tunstall, Staffordshire. Foundry of William Robert Renshaw
Victoria Works, Birmingham, pen-nib factory built 1840.

Rest of world
Victoria Foundry, Ottawa